Bloemencorso Bollenstreek is one of the flower parades in the Netherlands and one of the largest editions of the world. The event takes place in the end of April, The route starts on Saturday in Noordwijk and ends in the city of Haarlem the day after.

History
The origins of this event took place in the end of the 1940s, just after World War II. When the World War was over the need for parties and socializing was great. Organizing parades began. The procession consisted then of a couple with flower garlands and flower lingers, decorated trucks and handcarts. The local band preceded.

The first flower parade of the bulb region dates back to the year 1947, while it was Willem Warmenhoven, an amaryllis grower from Hillegom, who was the creator of the first adult float in the shape of a whale. On a rickety form a small truck was built and were concealed hyacinths. Hillegom invited Sassenheim and Lisse to cooperate this event, this was set at a large-scale parade and a small corsocomité. The spring parade is closely linked to the spring flower exhibition Keukenhof.

Route
Before the Parade Saturday, the procession draws on Friday Night through the village Noordwijkerhout with a light show.
When the route starts in the morning of Saturday, it proceeds as follows: Noordwijk – Voorhout – Sassenheim – Lisse – Hillegom – Bennebroek – Heemstede – Haarlem.

Gallery

See also
 Bloemencorso Vollenhove
 Bloemencorso Zundert

References
  About history

External links
 Official website

Parades in the Netherlands
Flower festivals in the Netherlands
Spring (season) events in the Netherlands
Culture of North Holland
Culture of South Holland
Culture in Haarlem
Bloemendaal
Heemstede
Hillegom
Lisse
Noordwijk
Teylingen
Events in Haarlem